Potton Brook  rises east of Gamlingay, Cambridgeshire, and flows southwest and then south through Potton and the John O'Gaunt Golf Club and into Sutton, Bedfordshire. Potton Brook curves west and northwest, and joins the River Ivel northeast of Lower Caldecote.

References

Rivers of Bedfordshire